This is a list of all personnel changes for the 2010 Indian Premier League.

Auction
The player auction was held on 19 January 2010 in Mumbai, India. 97 players from cricket playing countries other than India, registered for the auction. The list of players was then shortlisted by the franchises to 66 players.

Sold players

† In the tiebreakers, Kolkata Knight Riders bid $1,300,000 for Shane Bond and Mumbai Indians bid $2,750,000 for Kieron Pollard. The players' take was capped at $750,000 each by the IPL auction rules, with the rest going to IPL kitty.

Unsold players
The following players remained unsold at the end of the auction.

  Brad Haddin
  Phillip Hughes
  Ashley Noffke
  Jason Krejza
  Ben Laughlin
  Graham Manou
  Clint McKay
  Doug Bollinger
  Peter Siddle
  Tim Bresnan
  Anthony McGrath
  Monty Panesar
  Jonathan Trott
  Robert Key
  Mark Ramprakash
  Graeme Swann
   Grant Elliott
  Nathan McCullum
  Lou Vincent
  Mohammad Aamer
  Saeed Ajmal
  Umar Akmal
  Mohammad Irfan
  Rana Naved-ul-Hasan
  Imran Nazir
  Abdul Razzaq
  Misbah-ul-Haq
  Umar Gul
  Kamran Akmal
  Sohail Tanvir
  Zander de Bruyn
  Rory Kleinveldt
  Vernon Philander
  Lonwabo Tsotsobe
  Johan van der Wath
  Vaughn van Jaarsveld
  Morne van Wyk
  Tyron Henderson
  Malinga Bandara
  Thilina Kandamby
  Nuwan Kulasekara
  Upul Tharanga
  Kaushalya Weeraratne
  Chanaka Welegedara
  Chamara Silva
  Nuwan Zoysa
  Daren Ganga
  Wavell Hinds
  Ramnaresh Sarwan
  Lendl Simmons
  Sulieman Benn
  Darren Bravo
  Shakib Al Hasan
  Murray Goodwin
  Rizwan Cheema
  Ryan ten Doeschate

  Adil Rashid
  Usman Afzaal
  James Foster
  Ian Butler
  Chris Cairns
   Brendon Diamanti
  Martin Guptill
  Daryl Tuffey
  Shahid Afridi
  Ahmed Shehzad
  Fawad Alam
  Salman Butt
  Imran Farhat
  Mohammad Hafeez
  Yasir Hameed
  Faisal Iqbal
  Asim Kamal
  Danish Kaneria
  Mohammad Khalil
  Abdur Rauf
  Khalid Latif
  Azhar Mahmood
  Shoaib Malik
  Khurram Manzoor
  Mohammad Shami
  Nicky Boje
  Tyron Henderson
  André Nel
  CJ de Villiers
  Indika de Saram
  Chinthaka Jayasinghe
  Chamara Kapugedera
  Suranga Lakmal
  Jehan Mubarak
  Dammika Prasad
  Muthumudalige Pushpakumara
  Suraj Randiv
  Rangana Herath
  Gihan Rupasinghe
  Carlton Baugh
  Tino Best
  Shahriar Nafees
  Ray Price
  Khurram Chohan
  Niall O'Brien

Under-19 players
Three Indian under-19 players, priced at 800,000, were eligible to play in the competition and they were chosen by a draft system.

Trades
The trade window was open from 15 December 2009, to 5 January 2010.

See also
 2009 IPL player auction
 2011 IPL player auction

References

2010 Indian Premier League
Indian Premier League personnel changes